Cyrille Thouvenin (born 15 May 1976) is a French actor. Former pupil of Cours Florent and a graduate of the National Conservatory of Dramatic Art (class of 2001).

Fascinated by Molière, he started on television and then quickly made his classes at the cinema. He was appointed to Caesars in 2001 as "Most Promising Newcomer" for La Confusion des genres. He followed roles in film and television. He does not forget the theater, and also devoted himself to writing.

In 2011, he co-wrote and directed the show Laurent Lafitte: comme son nom l'indique palais des Glaces and théâtre des Mathurins.

Personal life 

He is openly gay.

Filmography

Film 

 2010 :  by  : Léo
 2009 :  by  : David Fontana
 2008 : Phénomènes (The Happening) by M. Night Shyamalan : French Bicyclist's Friend
 2006 :  by  : Stan
 2005 :  by Yves Angelo : The soldier amputee brawl
 2005 :  by Stéphan Guérin-Tillié : Antoine
 2003 :  by Emmanuelle Bercot : Yann
 2002 :  by  : Victor
 2001 : Oui, mais... by Yves Lavandier : Sébastien 'Seb' Douglas
 2000 : La Confusion des genres by  : Christophe
 2000 : In extremis by Étienne Faure : Man in Black 1
 2000 : Juste une question d'amour by Christian Faure : Laurent

Television 

 2010 : Des intégrations ordinaires (TV movie) France 2  by Julien Sicard :
 2010 : Enquêtes réservées (TV series) France 3  by Patrick Dewolf and Clémentine Dabadie – Contre-plongée (Season 2 episodes 7) : Cipriani
 2010: Sable noir (TV series) Jimmy  by Eric Valette, Xavier Gens and Samuel Le Bihan – Les âmes meurtries (Season 2 episodes 3) : Toussaint
 2009 : Les Petits Meurtres d'Agatha Christie  (TV series)  France 2  by Éric Woreth – La plume empoisonnée (episodes 3) : father Hector
 2008 : La Veuve tatouée (TV movie) France 2  by Virginie Sauveur : Vincent
 2006 : L'Avare (TV movie) France 3  by Christian de Chalonge : Cléante
 2006 : Pour l'amour de Dieu (TV movie) Arte  by Zakia Bouchaâla and Ahmed Bouchaâla : Bilal
 2003 : Charles II: The Power and The Passion (mini-series)  BBC by Joe Wright (épisode 3) : Philippe d’Orléans "Monsieur"
 2003 : Quelques jours entre nous (TV movie) Arte  by Virginie Sauveur : Vincent
 2003 : Les Parents terribles (TV movie) France 2  by Josée Dayan : Michel "Mick"
 2003 : Les Liaisons dangereuses (mini-series) France 2  by Josée Dayan : Hugo / Ludovic
 2001 : L'Interpellation (TV movie) Arte  de Marco Pauly : Lionel Brunel
 2001 : Dérives (TV movie) Arte  by Pierre Chosson  and Christophe Lamotte : Denis
 2000 : Un morceau de soleil (TV movie) France 3  by Dominique Cheminal : Martin
 2000 : Juste une question d'amour (TV movie) France 3  by Christian Faure : Laurent
 1999 : Madame le proviseur (TV series) France 2  by Jean-Marc Seban – La Saison des bouffons (Season 4 episodes 9) : Le lycée #2
 1999 : Madame le proviseur (TV series) France 2  by Jean-Marc Seban – L'heure de la sortie (Season 4 episodes 10) : Le lycée #2
 1999 : Le Choix d’Élodie (TV movie) M6  by Emmanuelle Bercot : Harry
 1999 : Joséphine, ange gardien (TV series) TF1  by Dominique Baron – La part du doute (Season 2 episodes 2) : Gaël
 1998 : Quai numéro un (TV series) France 2  by Patrick Jamain – Les cobras (episodes 11) : Snake
 1998 : Commandant Nerval (mini-series) TF1  by Arnaud Sélignac – Une femme dangereuse (Season 1 episodes 3) : Vincent Cheminal

short 

 2010 : Ellipse (short)  by Lynne Moses: the Rapist/The Boyfriend
 2009 : L.O.V.E... (short)  by Rachel Huet: Jean
 2004 : Sad Day (short)  by Mark Maggiori : Kyo
 2003 : Signe d'hiver (short)  by Jean-Claude Moireau : Vincent
 2002 : Quelqu'un vous aime (short)  by Emmanuelle Bercot  : Yann
 2000 : Un Arabe ouvert (short)  by Hervè Lasgouttes: riffraff
 2001 : Tempus fugit (short)  by Yves Piat : Romier

Other 
 2010 : Guibert cinéma (Documentary) CinéCinéma Club  by Anthony Doncque : interpreting texts Hervé Guibert
 2004 : Jean Cocteau (Documentary) Arte  by Pierre Philippe – Jean Cocteau, le passeur : reader of poems
 2004 : Jean Cocteau (Documentary) Arte  by Pierre Philippe – Jean Cocteau, le phénix: reader of poems

Theater 
 2013 : American Blues, de Tennessee Williams, directed by Juliette de Charnacé, Tournée
 2011 : Hamlet, de William Shakespeare, directed by Jean-Luc Revol, Festival de Grignan
 2010 : Hymne à l'amour 2, de Scaron, directed by Juliette de Charnacé, MC93 Bobigny
 2006 : Le Gardien d'Harold Pinter, directed by Didier Long, théâtre de l'Œuvre
 2005 : Vincent River, pièce de théâtre de Philip Ridley, directed by Jean-Luc Revol, théâtre du Marais
 2003 : Faust ou la Tragédie du savant directed by Catherine Marnas en tournée
 2001 : Qui je suis ? directed by Catherine Marnas, théâtre de la Criée
 2000 : Becket ou l'Honneur de Dieu, de Jean Anouilh, directed by Didier Long, tournée

Writing 
 Laurent Lafitte, comme son nom l'indique

Discography 
 2009 : Hervé Guibert: L'écrivain-Photographe textes lus, avec Jean-Louis Trintignant, Juliette Gréco, Dominique A livre audio
 2010 : AudioInstants, Compilation. 2 titres : "Tes états d'âme ...Eric" et "Parker Par coeur"

Awards 
 2001 : au César du cinéma, il a été nommé pour le meilleur espoir masculin : La confusion des genres
 2003 : au Festival du film de télévision de Luchon, il a remporté le prix d'interprétation pour Quelques jours entre nous
 2011 : au Los Angeles cinema festival of hollywood, pour The philosopher, il a remporté le prix de best supporting actor.

See also
 French television

References

External links 
 Site officiel de l'acteur

1976 births
Living people
French male film actors
French male stage actors
French male television actors
French gay actors
French National Academy of Dramatic Arts alumni
Cours Florent alumni
21st-century French LGBT people